Julianna Guill (born 1987) is an American actress. She is known for her roles as Bree in the 2009 film Friday the 13th, Madison Penrose in My Super Psycho Sweet 16, Scarlet Hauksson in the web series My Alibi, Becca Riley in Bravo's Girlfriends' Guide to Divorce, and Jessie Nevin on FOX's The Resident, as well as Christie on the TBS series Glory Daze. She currently stars on the Spectrum Original television series Joe Pickett.

Early life
Guill is one of three children who all grew up singing and acting. She was born in Winston-Salem, North Carolina, to parents Ann and Earl Guill. She began tap, ballet and jazz dance at an early age, and continued singing in the choir while at R.J. Reynolds High School, from which she graduated in 2005. She performed in local theater productions, and attended New York University before moving to Los Angeles.

Career
Guill has made numerous guest appearances in television series such as One Tree Hill, CSI: Miami, 90210, How I Met Your Mother, Criminal Minds and CSI: Crime Scene Investigation. In 2009, she appeared in the starring role of Katy in the direct-to-DVD film Road Trip: Beer Pong, which is a sequel to the 2000 comedy film Road Trip.

Guill appeared in the horror film Friday the 13th, a 2009 remake of the original film. The same year, Guill played sweet 16 girl Madison Penrose in MTV's slasher horror television film, My Super Psycho Sweet 16, which premiered on October 22, 2009. She briefly reprised the character in My Super Psycho Sweet 16: Part 2, which premiered in October 2010. The following week saw the premiere of the horror film Altitude, with Guill in a starring role.

In 2010 Guill was cast in a starring role the TBS comedy series Glory Daze. The same year she starred the web series Sweety for the web site Sweety High, after starring in the web series My Alibi the previous year.

Guill appeared in the Steve Carell 2011 comedy film Crazy, Stupid, Love, and in the 2012 horror film The Apparition, from Dark Castle Entertainment. She guest starred in the NBC comedy Community as Head Cheerleader in "A Fistful of Paintballs". Guill is friends with Community star Alison Brie, with whom she co-starred in My Alibi; along with fellow My Alibi co-star Cyrina Fiallo, they perform together as a singing group The Girls. Between 2014 and 2017, she played Becca Riley in the Bravo television series Girlfriends' Guide to Divorce starring Lisa Edelstein.

Since 2018, Guill has played the recurring role of Jessie Nevin, the sister of Nic Nevin (Emily VanCamp), on the FOX medical drama series, The Resident. In 2021, she was cast as Marybeth Pickett, the wife of the titular character, in the Spectrum Original television drama series Joe Pickett.

Filmography

Film

Television

Web series

Music video
 "I Wanna" (2009) by The All-American Rejects, as Ex-Girlfriend

References

External links

1987 births
Living people
21st-century American actresses
Actresses from North Carolina
American child actresses
American film actresses
American television actresses
New York University alumni
Actors from Winston-Salem, North Carolina